The AMVCA Trailblazer Award is a special award given by MultiChoice to an actor through Africa Magic for outstanding achievement the previous year.

Awards

List of Awardees

2013 Africa Magic Viewers Choice Awards 
 Ivie Okujaye

2014 Africa Magic Viewers Choice Awards 
 Michelle Bello

2015 Africa Magic Viewers Choice Awards 
 C.J. Obasi

2016 Africa Magic Viewers Choice Awards 
 Kemi Lala Akindoju

2017 Africa Magic Viewers Choice Awards 
 Somkele Iyamah

2018 Africa Magic Viewers Choice Awards 
 Bisola Aiyeola

References 

African film awards
Trailblazer